Gavin Stone (born May 21, 1997) is a Canadian rower.

Career

He began competitive rowing with the Island Lake Rowing Club.

In May 2021, Stone competed in the men's fours event at the Final Olympic qualification tournament, finishing in second place and qualifying for the 2020 Summer Olympics. In June 2021, Stone was named to Canada's 2020 Olympic team.

References

1997 births
Canadian male rowers
Living people
Sportspeople from Brampton
Olympic rowers of Canada
Rowers at the 2020 Summer Olympics
21st-century Canadian people